The Scarlet Dove (1928 film)
 The Scarlet Dove (1961 film)